The 2023 Missouri Tigers football team will represent the University of Missouri in the Eastern Division of the Southeastern Conference (SEC) during the 2023 NCAA Division I FBS football season. The Tigers are expected to be led by Eliah Drinkwitz in his fourth season as their head coach.

The Missouri football team plays its home games at Faurot Field in Columbia, Missouri.

Schedule

References

Missouri
Missouri Tigers football seasons
Missouri Tigers football